Willow Creek in Folsom, California flows into Lake Natoma. The Humbug Willow Creek trail offers walking and cycling along the creek.

References

American River (California)